Talakan Airport  is an airport in Lensky District of Yakutia, Russia. It is located 105 km north-west of Vitim. The airport services .

Talakan airport is the first in Russia, built solely by a private company.

History
On 23 November 2012, a Tupolev Tu-154 belonging to UTair Airlines successfully completed the first technical flight to «Talakan» airport. On 20 December 2012, a direct flight by a Boeing 737 from Surgut to Talakan was made with 26 passengers on board, representing management of Surgutneftegas. They verified readiness of the facilities and equipment of the airport "Talakan" to start regular operations. On 24 December 2012, the airport welcomed its first scheduled passenger flight.

Facilities 
The airport services Antonov An-12, Antonov An-24, Antonov An-26, Antonov An-28, Antonov An-30, Antonov An-32, Antonov An-72, Antonov An-74, Antonov An-148, Ilyushin Il-76, Let L-410 Turbolet, Tupolev Tu-134, Tupolev Tu-154, Yakovlev Yak-40, Yakovlev Yak-40, ATR 42, ATR 72, Boeing 737-300(-400,-500,-700,-800), Bombardier CRJ 100/200 and all lighter types of aircraft.

Airlines and destinations

References

Airports in the Sakha Republic